Casta Diva is a 1935 Italian musical drama film directed by Carmine Gallone and starring Mártha Eggerth, Lamberto Picasso and Gualtiero Tumiati. The film won Best Italian Film at the 1935 Venice International Film Festival. An English-language version The Divine Spark was made at the same time, also directed by Gallone and starring Eggerth. Gallone remade the film in 1954 in Technicolor.

The film's sets were designed by the art directors Werner Schlichting and Enrico Verdozzi. Location shooting took place around Catania in Sicily.

In Bellini's opera, Norma, the soprano's plea to the moon goddess in Act I begins Casta diva, and the aria is well known by that name.

Plot
The film concerns Italian composer Vincenzo Bellini and his problems with his opera Norma (1831), which itself tells the passionate love story of a Gallican priestess of the local Celtic religion and a Roman proconsul (governor of a province). The film is unique because it uses abstract paintings-in-motion to express the passion between the two main characters.

Cast
 Mártha Eggerth as Maddelena Fumarol
 Sandro Palmieri as Vincenzo Bellini
 Gualtiero Tumiati as Niccolò Paganini
 Lamberto Picasso as Fumaroli
 Achille Majeroni as Gioacchino Rossini
 Lina Marengo as a guest
 Giulio Donadio as Felice Romani 
 Ennio Cerlesi as Ernesto Tosi 
 Vasco Creti as Rettore del Conservatorio 
 Bruna Dragoni as Giuditta Pasta 
 Maurizio D'Ancora as Saverio Mercadante 
 Cesare Bettarini as Francesco Fiorino 
 Alfredo Robert as Ferdinand I of the Two Sicilies
 Gino Viotti as Maestro Zingarelli

References

External links

1935 films
1930s musical drama films
1930s biographical drama films
Italian musical drama films
Italian biographical drama films
1930s Italian-language films
Films directed by Carmine Gallone
Italian multilingual films
Films set in 1831
Films about composers
Films about classical music and musicians
Films about opera
Italian black-and-white films
Cultural depictions of Niccolò Paganini
Italian historical musical films
1930s historical musical films
Cultural depictions of classical musicians
Cultural depictions of Italian men
Films shot in Italy
1935 multilingual films
1935 drama films
1930s Italian films